Sant'Agata di Militello (Sicilian: Sant'Àita di Militeddu) is a comune (municipality) in the Metropolitan City of Messina in the Italian region Sicily, located about  east of Palermo and about  west of Messina.

Sant'Agata di Militello borders the following municipalities: Acquedolci, Militello Rosmarino, San Fratello, Torrenova.

People
 Vincenzo Consolo (1933–2012)

References

Cities and towns in Sicily